Deputy speakers of the National Assembly of Hungary.

1990–1994

1994–1998

1998–2002

2002–2006

2006–2010

2010–2014

2014–2018

Deputy Speakers for Legislation

Since 2014, the Chairpersons of the Legislative Committee are also ex officio Deputy Speakers for Legislation:

2018–2022

Deputy Speakers for Legislation

2022–

Deputy Speakers for Legislation

Sources
Official website

National Assembly, Deputy Speakers
Hungary, National Assembly, Deputy Speakers
Hungary, National Assembly